Ti Shqipëri, më jep nder, më jep emrin Shqipëtar (English: You Albania, you give me honour, you give me the name Albanian) is the national motto of Albania. The phrase was used in the poem O malet e Shqipërisë, written by Naim Frashëri, proclaimed national poet.

References

See also 
 National symbols of Albania
 Culture of Albania

National symbols of Albania
National mottos
Albanian culture